The PAC Cresco is a turboprop-powered derivative of the Fletcher FU-24 (later called the PAC Fletcher) aerial topdressing aircraft, manufactured by the Pacific Aerospace Corporation in Hamilton, New Zealand. The Cresco was superseded by the PAC P-750 XSTOL in the early 21st century, but in 2019 was returned to production with the first new aircraft being completed 3 December 2020.

Design and development

The Cresco is a low-wing monoplane which, like the Fletcher but unlike most topdressers, has tricycle undercarriage and places the cabin forward of the hopper, at the leading edge of the wing - which gives the pilot of the Cresco a good field of vision.  The high-lift wing has pronounced dihedral on the outer span.  The prototype Cresco (ZK-LTP) had an all-moving tailplane, but was lost when the tailplane separated in flight, (the pilot parachuting to safety). Subsequent aircraft have had conventional tails.

Sales of the Cresco were not as impressive as those of the piston-engine powered Fletcher, with only 39 examples being built before production was terminated.  The Cresco has been sold in several countries and has pioneered new utility roles not explored by the Fletcher. Although used primarily to spread superphosphate fertiliser, the Cresco is also used in the utility role, especially as a skydiving platform, where its fast rate of climb has made it popular, and as a firefighting water bomber, a role it can perform with little alteration from its standard agricultural layout. One aircraft has been converted for aeromagnetic survey. A disadvantage in the utility role is the low internal volume available for the relatively high-powered engine.

The Cresco is normally flown by a single pilot, but has a second seat in all versions. It can carry nine sky divers. Usual powerplant is a  Pratt & Whitney Canada PT6-34AG.

The PAC 750XL, a utility aircraft was derived from the Cresco, and retains its high-lift wing.  As of January 2019 120 PAC 750XL's have been produced and it remains in high demand as an uncompromising utility aircraft able to operate in hot and high conditions.

Cresco II
On 17 December 2019 Pacific Aerospace posted on Facebook an announcement by CEO Mark Crouch that the type would return to production as the Cresco II, with some modifications regarding pilot safety and comfort, for the New Zealand customer Rural Air Work Ltd.

Variants
Cresco 08-600
Initial production version, powered by 447 kW (600 shp) Lycoming LTP 101-700A-1A engine.
Cresco 08-750
More powerful version with 559 kW (750 shp) Pratt & Whitney PT6A-34AG engine. Production from 1992.
Cresco II
Improved cockpit sealing and air conditioning, more use of P-750 components, a carbon fiber engine cowl, and an EFIS avionics setup. Production from 2019.

Specifications (Cresco 08-600)

See also

References

 Ewing, Ross and MacPherson, Ross The History of New Zealand Aviation, Heinemann, 1986
 Geelen, Janic The Topdressers NZ Aviation Press. Te Awamutu, 1983.
 Jackson, Paul. Jane's All The World's Aircraft 2003-2004. Coulsdon, UK: Jane's Information Group. .
 Knowles, Alan, New Zealand Aircraft, IPL Books, Wellington, 1990.
 Taylor, John W. R. (editor). Jane's All The World's Aircraft 1988-89. Coulsdon, UK: Jane's Defence Data. .

External links

 Manufacturer's web site
Utility Aircraft, the US Distributor
 RCAF requirement
 Cresco web site

Cresco
1970s New Zealand agricultural aircraft
Single-engined tractor aircraft
Low-wing aircraft
Single-engined turboprop aircraft
Aircraft first flown in 1979